Ron or Ronald Hughes may refer to:

Ron Hughes (footballer, born 1930) (1930–2019), Welsh football player for Chester City F.C.
Ron Hughes (goalkeeper), football goalkeeper for Workington A.F.C.
Ron Hughes (American football) (1943–2019), American football scout and executive
Ronald Hughes (1935–1970), attorney involved in Manson case
Ronald Laurence Hughes (1920–2003), Australian Army officer